Morelli was an Italian coachbuilding firm based in Ferrara and active in the 1950s and the 1960s, making primarily Aluminum bodies for OSCA. Of the some 200 cars produced by OSCA, perhaps 80 were MT4 models, and of the MT4 models, records show 40 Spiders with Morelli of Ferrara bodies. All five OSCA FS 372 Spiders (an updated version of the MT4) were bodied by Morelli.

Cars
1948 Turolla Fiat 500 A testa Siata Coupé Morelli
1949 CI-MA Fiat 500 Siluro carrozzato chiuso Morelli
1950 Turolla Fiat 750 Berlinetta Morelli
1953 Nardi-Danese Marco Spider Morelli
1953 Ferrari 250 MM Spider Morelli - (s/n 0276MM)
1953–1955 OSCA MT4 2AD 1500 Spider Morelli
1953–1954 Ermini 357 Sport 
1957 OSCA MT4 TN 1500 S Spider Morelli
1957 OSCA S 750 Spider Morelli
1957-1958 OSCA FS 372 Spider Morelli
1960 OSCA 2000 Desmodromico

Racing Sport Cars Result

References

Coachbuilders of Italy